William S. Roberts (September 4, 1913 – March 5, 1997) was a screenwriter. 
 
His screenplays include: 
The Mating Game (1959),
The Magnificent Seven (1960),
The Wonderful World of the Brothers Grimm (1962),
Ride the High Country (1962; uncredited),
The Bridge at Remagen (1969),
Posse (1975).

Roberts was the creator of ABC's sitcom, The Donna Reed Show.

William Roberts died on March 5, 1997, in Los Angeles, California, of respiratory failure.

Notes

External links 

1913 births
1997 deaths
Writers from Los Angeles
American male screenwriters
Screenwriters from California
20th-century American male writers
20th-century American screenwriters
Respiratory disease deaths in California
Deaths from respiratory failure